Mark Andrew Pekala (born August 21, 1959) is a career foreign service officer who served as United States Ambassador to Latvia from 2012 to 2014, succeeding Judith G. Garber and being succeeded by Nancy Pettit.

He's been married with fellow career diplomat Maria Rosaria Pekala (born Alongi) since 2000. He speaks French, Estonian, Polish and Russian.

References

External links

Living people
1959 births
School of International and Public Affairs, Columbia University alumni
Ambassadors of the United States to Latvia
United States Foreign Service personnel
University of Michigan alumni